The Portland Trail Blazers were one of three new teams to join the NBA for the 1970–71 season. The franchise played its inaugural regular season game on a Friday night in Portland, beating the fellow expansion Cleveland Cavaliers 115–112 on October 16, with 4,273 in attendance.

The Trail Blazers played a regular season home game at McArthur Court in Eugene, Oregon on February 19, 1971 against the Cincinnati Royals. Portland was defeated by Cincinnati, 102–109.

Of the three expansion teams, their record was the best; with seven more wins than the Buffalo Braves and fourteen more than the Cavaliers. The leading scorer for the Blazers was Geoff Petrie; he averaged 24.8 points per game and shared Rookie of the Year honors with Boston Celtics star Dave Cowens.

Offseason

NBA Draft

Expansion Draft

Roster

Pre-season
The Trail Blazers convened their preseason camp on September 14, 1970. Sixteen players reported to camp, which was held in the gymnasium at Pacific University in Forest Grove, Oregon. Pat Riley was unable to attend the camp due to the death in his father. Players reported to drills at 10 am and 4 pm. The first players to be cut from camp were third round draft pick Bill Cain and Tim Robinson, who had played for the Harlem Globetrotters from 1961 to 1965.

Regular season

Season standings

Record vs. opponents

Game log

Footnotes
 The game was held at the Oakland Civic Auditorium in Oakland, California.
 The game was held at Seattle Center Coliseum in Seattle, Washington.
 The game was held at San Diego Sports Arena in San Diego, California.
 The game was held at the Spectrum in Philadelphia, Pennsylvania.
 The game was held at War Memorial in Rochester, New York.
 The game was held at McArthur Court in Eugene, Oregon.
 The game was held at Boston Garden in Boston, Massachusetts.
 The game was held a Omaha Civic Auditorium in Omaha, Nebraska.

Transactions
 March 27, 1970: signed first round draft pick Geoff Petrie
 April 1, 1970: signed second round draft pick Walt Gilmore
 April 6, 1970: signed third round draft pick Bill Cain and tenth round draft pick Israel Oliver
 April 21, 1970: hired Rolland Todd as head coach
 April 27, 1970: hired Stu Inman chief scout and director of player personnel
 April 30, 1970: signed eighth round draft pick Doug Boyd
 May 10, 1970: see Expansion Draft, traded Larry Siegfried to the San Diego Clippers in exchange for Jim Barnett.
 June 5, 1970: signed seventh round draft pick Claude English and ninth round draft pick Billy Gaskins
 August 11, 1970: signed expansion draft pick Rick Adelman
 August 19, 1970: signed expansion draft pick Pat Riley
 August 28, 1970: placed Fred Hetzel on waivers (claimed by the Los Angeles Lakers)
 September 3, 1970: signed expansion draft picks Stan McKenzie and Joe Kennedy
 September 11, 1970: re-signed Jim Barnett to a two-year contract valued at $35,000–$40,000 a year
 September 21, 1970: placed Bill Cain and Tim Robinson on waivers
 September 25, 1970: placed Walt Simon on waivers
 September 30, 1970: placed Joe Kennedy on waivers
 October 7, 1970: sold Pat Riley to the Los Angeles Lakers
 October 20, 1970: traded a 1971 NBA draft pick (second round) to the Chicago Bulls in exchange for Shaler Halimon
 October 22, 1970: traded Dorie Murrey to the Baltimore Bullets in exchange for a 1971 NBA draft pick (second round) and draft right to Bill Stricker
 October 26, 1970: signed free agent Bill Stricker
 November 16, 1970: waived Bill Stricker
 March 23, 1971: traded Jim Barnett to the San Francisco Warriors in exchange for two 1971 NBA draft picks (second and third rounds) and a 1972 NBA draft pick (second round)
 April 6, 1971: Waived Claude English

Media
On September 13, 1970, the Trail Blazers announced that KPTV would broadcast 12 road games (all in color) during their inaugural season. Jimmy Jones was Portland's play-by-play announcer on television.

Awards and honors
 Geoff Petrie, Co-Rookie of the Year

References

External links
 Blazers on Database Basketball
 Blazers on Basketball Reference

Portland
Portland Trail Blazers seasons
Portland Trail Blazers 1970
Portland Trail Blazers 1970
Portland
Portland